"Liverpool 8" is a song by Ringo Starr and is the lead track on his 2008 album of the same name. The song was also released in early December 2007 as a download-single. It was later released in physical formats (7" single and CD single) on 7 January 2008, a week before the release of the album. The B-side for the 7" is the third track from the album, "For Love". Despite the physical single being available for only 99 pence in the UK, it only reached number 99 there.

The song is an autobiography of Starr put to song, with emphasis on his time with the Beatles.  The title refers to the postal district of the Toxteth area of Liverpool in which Starr was born. The single was initially produced by Starr and Mark Hudson, a long-time collaborator of Starr. When Hudson was fired by the former Beatle, Dave Stewart was hired to help finish both the single and the studio album.

Track listings
Download, CD CDLIV8
 "Liverpool 8"

Red vinyl 7" LIV8
 "Liverpool 8"
 "For Love"

References

Ringo Starr songs
2007 songs
2008 singles
Songs written by David A. Stewart
Songs written by Ringo Starr
Capitol Records singles